Rasmus Olsen Langeland (8 February 1873 – 1954) was the Norwegian Minister of Labour 1931–1933.

He was father of Olav Rasmussen Langeland.

1873 births
1954 deaths
Government ministers of Norway